Farid Ali (born 11 February 1992) is a Ukrainian professional footballer of Yemeni descent who plays as a winger for Polish side GKS Jastrzębie.

Ali is a product of the FC Arsenal Kyiv youth team system.

He made his debut for Metalurh Zaporizhzhia in the Ukrainian Premier League in a match against FC Karpaty Lviv on 31 October 2015.

References

External links
 
 

1992 births
Living people
Ukrainian footballers
Ukrainian expatriate footballers
FC Metalurh Zaporizhzhia players
GKS Jastrzębie players
Ukrainian Premier League players
I liga players
II liga players
III liga players
Association football wingers
Expatriate footballers in Poland
Ukrainian expatriate sportspeople in Poland